"The Forms of Things Unknown" is an episode of the original The Outer Limits television show. It first aired on May 4, 1964, and was the final episode of the first season. It was filmed in a dual format as both a regular episode of The Outer Limits and as a pilot episode for a possible series called The Unknown. The opening and closing narration listed here are only in The Unknown version and not in the broadcast The Outer Limits episode. There are plot differences between the two versions as well.

Opening narration (used for The Unknown pilot)
There is a fear that is unlike all other fears. It has a special, clammy chill, a deadly gift for inspiring deeper, darker dread. It is the fear of unentered rooms, of bends in lonely roads. It is the fear of the phone call in the middle of the night, of the stranger you recognize, perhaps from a nightmare. It is the fear of the unexpected, the unfamiliar. It is the fear of... THE UNKNOWN.

Plot
The plot involves two women who kill a blackmailer. Driving through the countryside with the body in the trunk, looking for a good place to bury him, they take refuge from a storm in a house containing a blind man and a strange young inventor who is experimenting with time. Unlike the traditional "time travel" devices, this one is intended to "tilt the cycles of time" and bring the dead back to life...which is what happens to the murdered blackmailer.

Detailed synopsis

The story begins in the French countryside, where a car can be seen driving at high speed. The driver, Andre Pavan a wealthy playboy, is kissing his girlfriend Kassia Paine while Kassia's friend Leonora Edmond sits in the back seat.

Andre decides to stop at a small lake for a swim, stripping down to his swim trunks. He orders the women to make him a drink, and they do so – but lace the cocktail shaker with a leaf from the deadly Thanatos plant. Andre, with jovial cruelty, makes the women serve his drink while he stands in the water, ruining their "fine stilletto heels" as he puts it. He drinks a toast to blackmailing Leonora's father in London, and dies immediately, but with a strange smile on his face.

The women load Andre's corpse and clothing into the trunk of the car and drive in search of a place to bury it. Leonora is unnerved by the whole thing, and becomes more nervous after they encounter a funeral procession. When night falls and a thunderstorm starts, Leonora's nerves are on edge. Kassia tries to calm her, but then the trunk comes open. They stop the car to check on Andre, who hasn't moved. But a lightning flash makes it seem to Leonora as though he had blinked, and she runs off, frightened. Kassia catches up to her and tries again to calm her, but both women see a shadowy figure standing nearby. This is too much for Leonora, who runs to a nearby house. A blind man, Monsieur Colas, answers the door and lets the women in from the storm. Colas explains that "Mr. Hobart" is not at home, but will return soon.

The house is spacious but oddly decorated: the most prominent features are a broken clock with a clown face, and a toy tightrope walker. Leonora seems particularly drawn to the tightrope walker. At last, Tone Hobart, an odd inventor, comes home. He apologizes to the women, explaining it was him they saw outside. He goes upstairs to his room, asking not to be disturbed as he works on his invention. As he opens the door, Andre's corpse can be seen placed on a strange device. Kassia decides to check on the car – and Andre, leaving Leonora alone.

Leonora looks on in mesmerized fascination at the tightrope walker. Hobart enters the room and asks her about what happened to Andre. Leonora answers truthfully, seemingly under hypnosis. When Hobart "snaps her out of it", he invites her upstairs to see Andre live again and be free of her guilt over the murder. He explains he'd created a device that can "tilt" the past into the present and resurrect the dead, including himself. Reluctantly, Leonora agrees to see the device. They come to Hobart's room – which is dominated by the time tilter, a large collection of clocks all connected by wires to a pole in the center of the room. The loud ticking is too much for Leonora, who runs back downstairs and faints. Hobart is more interested in the fact that Andre is not there.

When Leonora awakens, Kassia has returned. Hobart has gone outside to look for Andre – and takes a moment to look through the window from outside, unnervingly. Colas explains, with some indignation, that he is not Hobart's servant, as the women had supposed, but the house's owner, and Hobart is his boarder. Colas explains further that Hobart had apparently died, and when his body was placed on the time tilter, he came back to life.

The women decide to leave but get no further than the front door when they see the car has backed up to the entrance, the trunk opens and a fully-clothed Andre pops out, smiling and holding his empty cocktail glass. He cheerfully asks, "Refill?" This is too much for Leonora, who runs upstairs into what seems to be an empty room. Colas goes outside to find Hobart, and finds him lying in the road between a set of tire tracks, but unhurt. Hobart now realizes that he has unleashed a monster and comes back to the house to correct that mistake.

Surprisingly, Kassia and Andre are kissing passionately. Andre takes a moment to ask how he died, and when Kassia tells him they used a leaf from the Thanatos plant. Andre is still intent on blackmail. Kassia tries to dissuade him as Andre is already rich. Andre replies, "I'm noisy rich. I want to be quiet rich." Kassia says one has to be born to that and comments on Andre's motivations. Andre cheerfully replies, "You've pierced the heart of my psychic disorder," but remains intent on carrying out his plot.

Hobart loads a pistol, intending to force Andre to return to the time tilter. Andre is more amused by this than anything else, especially when Hobart becomes enthralled by the tightrope walker toy, allowing Andre to disarm him. Andre fires a shot into the easy chair, inches from Hobart's head. He tosses the pistol aside, singing "London Bridge is falling down" and drives off with Kassia. They do not get far, though. Kassia leaps out of the car and Andre stops, backs up, and then tries to run over Kassia as she lies in the road. Kassia is able to leap out of the way and the car crashes, killing Andre again, with an odd smile on his face.

Hobart realizes he has failed and goes upstairs, seeing Leonora near an open briefcase. Inside is a letter that Hobart wrote when he was a boy, which Hobart reads to Leonora from memory, apologizing to his father for leaving school to find a way to bring dead people (initially his mother) back to life. (There is an inconsistency here, as the camera clearly shows the words on the letter saying that Hobart actually apologized to his father for "killing the cat".) Hobart asks Leonora to destroy the time tilter after he has used it to return himself to the past, where he is dead. Leonora panics, runs into the time tilter room and closes the door behind her. Hobart is able to open the door and push Leonora away from the device. He steps into it and disappears.

Production
The show was filmed with two endings and was allotted double the normal production time. In the pilot version: Andre reveals there is no Thanatos plant, and was thus not dead; the time tilter did not in fact work; Hobart was not dead but merely in a coma; and lastly, Kassia uses the pistol to kill Hobart, thinking he is attacking Leonora.

Closing narration (used for The Unknown pilot)
Murder, madness, and other lurking horrors are the raw certainties that await you in the depths of the Unknown. And no switch of time, no twist of plan can cancel your meeting with it. For some night, in some blind panic, you will venture into the world of dark reality. And on that night, you will keep your rendez-vous with... THE UNKNOWN.

Technique
The episode is considered an unusual one, even for The Outer Limits. More than almost any other, it is filled with weird camera angles, atmospheric photography, gothic sets, creepy music (much of which surfaced later in the TV series The Invaders), and offbeat writing and performances, giving the episode something of an "art house movie" feel.

Cast

This episode was the final acting role of Sir Cedric Hardwicke. He died on August 6, 1964, three months after this episode aired.

External links
 

The Outer Limits (1963 TV series season 1) episodes
1964 American television episodes
Television episodes written by Joseph Stefano
Television episodes about time travel
Television episodes directed by Gerd Oswald